"Finally Home" is a 2008 song by MercyMe from the album All That Is Within Me. The phrase may also refer to:
"Finally Home", a 2012 song by Kerrie Roberts from the album Time for the Show
"Finally Home", a 2015 song by Jeremy Camp from the album I Will Follow